Sergey Pavlovich Tolstov (7 February 1907 – 28 December 1976) was a Russian and Soviet archaeologist and ethnographer. Tolstov was the organizer and the first director (between 1937 and 1969) of the Chorasmian Expedition credited with discovery and investigation of archeological monuments of Khwarezm. He is also the author of the book Old Khwarezm, the seminal work in the field. In 1953, Tolstov was elected the corresponding member of the Academy of Sciences of the Soviet Union.

Tolstov was born in Saint Petersburg, his father was a military officer. In 1930, he graduated from Moscow State University, where he studied at two faculties simultaneously: Physics and mathematics, and History and ethnology. Between 1929 and 1936 he was a researcher at the Museum of Peoples of the Soviet Union.

In 1939, Tolstov was appointed the head of the newly created Department of Ethnography at Moscow State University, and in 1942 he became the director of the Ethnography Institute of the Academy of Sciences of the Soviet Union. This made him the highest ranked ethnographer in the Soviet Union.

References

1907 births
1976 deaths
Moscow State University alumni
Soviet archaeologists
Soviet ethnographers
Corresponding Members of the USSR Academy of Sciences
Members of the German Academy of Sciences at Berlin
Etnograficheskoe Obozrenie editors